London Road Industrial Estate, Brandon is a  biological Site of Special Scientific Interest (SSSI) in Brandon in Suffolk.

This very small meadow in the middle of an industrial estate has been designated an SSSI because it has the largest known wild population in Britain of the nationally rare Artemisia campestris, which is thought to have survived due to periodic soil disturbance.

There is access to the site by a stile.

References

Sites of Special Scientific Interest in Suffolk
Brandon, Suffolk